Shahin Kheiri (born April 20, 1980) is an Iranian footballer who plays for Naft Tehran F.C. in the IPL.

Club career
Kheiri joined Sepahan F.C. in 2009.

Club career statistics

 Assist Goals

Honours

Club
Iran's Premier Football League
Winner: 2
2005/06 with Esteghlal
2009/10 with Sepahan

References

1980 births
Living people
Esteghlal F.C. players
Zob Ahan Esfahan F.C. players
Sanat Mes Kerman F.C. players
Sepahan S.C. footballers
Naft Tehran F.C. players
Iranian footballers
Association football midfielders